Moreland is a historic home located at Bethesda, Montgomery County, Maryland, United States. It is a -story early Colonial Revival frame dwelling that was constructed about 1894. The home was the summer residence for Washington, D.C., businessman and former District of Columbia Commissioner Samuel E. Wheatley, and that family owned it from 1894 until 1944.

Moreland was listed on the National Register of Historic Places in 2005.

References

External links
, including photo in 2004, at Maryland Historical Trust website

Houses on the National Register of Historic Places in Maryland
Houses completed in 1894
Houses in Montgomery County, Maryland
Colonial Revival architecture in Maryland
Buildings and structures in Bethesda, Maryland
National Register of Historic Places in Montgomery County, Maryland